Budnik is a hamlet in the Yadrovskaya Volost, part of the Pskovsky District of Pskov Oblast, Russia. Population: .

Geography

Population 
In 2000, the population numbered 2 people.

Notable people
In local lore, Budnik is the alleged birthplace of Vladimir the Great (ca.958–1015), the prince who Christianized the Kievan Rus'.

References

Rural localities in Pskov Oblast